ICICI Home Finance Company (ICICIHFC) is an Indian public limited housing finance company (HFC), headquartered in Mumbai with branches in major cities across India. The company operates as a wholly owned subsidiary of ICICI Bank and is registered with the regulation authority of India - National Housing Bank (NHB). It provides home and commercial loans, loan against property, gold loans and accepts fixed deposits.

History
The company was incorporated in 1999, under the Companies Act, 1956 as a wholly owned subsidiary of ICICI Bank. It was created by ICICI Bank to focus as a separate entity dedicated to provide housing finance. ICICI HFC is registered with National Housing Bank. The company operates all over the country and it has offices in all major cities across India.

ICICI HFC fixed deposits have received the highest ratings of MAAA by ICRA, FAAA by CRISIL and AAA rating from CARE.

Awards
2019: ‘Mortgage and Home Loan Product of the Year – India’ from Asian Banking & Finance
2018: Silver Award in the ‘Home Loan Provider of the Year 2018’ category from the Outlook Money Awards.

Product and services
ICICI HFC provides housing finance to individuals and corporates for purchase or construction of residential houses. In 2019, the company has disclosed that it has disbursed over $162.91 million in housing loans in the country. It offers home loans, loan against property, fixed deposit, gold loan, property search - residential & commercial, construction finance and insurance.

Branch network
The company started with six branches in 2017 and as of 2019, it has over 140 branches in India.

References

External links 
 

Companies listed on the Bombay Stock Exchange
Housing finance companies of India
Financial services companies based in Mumbai